The 1913 Penn Quakers football team was an American football team that represented the University of Pennsylvania in the 1913 college football season. In their first season under head coach George H. Brooke, the Quakers compiled a 6–3–1 record and outscored opponents by a total of 169 to 81.

Schedule

References

Penn
Penn Quakers football seasons
Penn Quakers football